Martin Hattala (4 November 1821 in Trstená, Kingdom of Hungary (today Slovakia) – 11 December 1903 in Prague) was a Slovak pedagogue, Roman Catholic theologian and linguist. He is best known for his reform of the Štúr's Slovak language, so-called Hodža-Hattala reform, in which he introduced the etymological principle to the Slovak language.

Linguistic publications 
 Grammatica linguae slovenicae collatae cum proxime cognata bohemica (Grammar of the Slovak language compared with the most closely related Czech language) (1850)
 Krátka mluvnica slovenská (A Concise Slovak Grammar) (1852)
 Zvukosloví jazyka staro- i novo českého a slovenského (Phonetics of the old and new Czech and Slovak language) (1854)
 O poměru Cyrillčiny k nynějším nářečím (On the relationship of Cyrillic to the contemporary dialects) (1855)
 Skladba jazyka českého (Syntax of the Czech language) (Prague 1855)
 Srovnávací mluvnice jazyka českého a slovenského (Comparative grammar of the Czech and Slovak language) (1857)
 O ablativě ve slovančině a litvančině (On the ablative in Slavic and Lithuanian) (1857-1858)
 Mnich Chrabr, příspěvek k objasnění původu písma slovanského (Monk Chrabr, contribution to clarify the origin of the Slavic script) (1858)
 Mluvnica jazyka slovenského I., II. (Grammar of Slovak) (1864, 1865)
 Počátečné skupeniny souhlásek československých (Initial consonant clusters in Czechoslovak) (1870)
 Brus jazyka českého. Příspěvek k dějinám osvěty vůbec a slovanské i české zvláště (Antibarbarus of the Czech language. Contribution to the history of the people's education in general and Slovak and Czech in particular) (Prague 1877)

1821 births
1903 deaths
People from Trstená
People from the Kingdom of Hungary
Linguists from Slovakia
19th-century Slovak people
19th-century linguists